Nils Samuel Swederus  also Svederus (24 August 1751 – 1833) was a Swedish naturalist.

His parents were Sigtuna Magnus Svederus and Anna Maria Christiernin.
Nils Samuel Swederus studied theology and other disciplines at the University of Uppsala. He was ordained in 
1780 and became a hofpredikanten  or  Royal Court chaplain in 1782. From 1784 to 1786 he  made scientific 
trips to several European countries—to England, France, Belgium and the Netherlands. In 1789  he became Vicar of Nasby and Ervalla parishes and dean of Fellingsbro. Nils Samuel Swederus  was especially interested in entomology and was elected to membership of several learned societies in Sweden and abroad. These included the Royal Swedish Academy of Sciences. He was married to Anna Margareta Oberg.

Works
1787 Fortsättning af Beskrifningen på 50 nya Species af Insecter. Kongliga Vetenskaps Academiens Nya Handlingar 8 (10–12): 276–290. Stockholm.
1795. Beskrifning på et nytt Genus Pteromalus ibland Insecterna, hörande til Hymenoptera, uti Herr Arch. och Ridd. v. Linnés Systema Naturæ. Kongliga Vetenskaps Academiens Nya Handlingar 16 (7–9, 10–12): 201–205, 216–222. Stockholm.

References
  Goran Waldeck Några svenska entomologer och andra naturforskare
Animalbase

Swedish entomologists
1751 births
1833 deaths